Visar is an Albanian masculine given name. 
People with the name Visar include:
Visar Arifaj (born 1987), Kosovar politician
Visar Bekaj (born 1997), Kosovar footballer
Visar Dodani (1857-1939), Albanian journalist and activist
Visar Mulliqi (born 1966), Kosovar impressionist and expressionist painter  
Visar Musliu (born 1994), Macedonian footballer 
Visar Ymeri (born 1973), Kosovar-Albanian activist and politician

References

Albanian masculine given names